Committee for the Initiative for Permanent Revolutionary Action (in French: Comité d'Initiative pour une Action Révolutionnaire Permanente) was a radical Marxist-Leninist group in Senegal. CIARP was founded by the Blondin Diop brothers following a split in the Movement of Young Marxist-Leninists.

CIARP was dismantled by Senegalese police in July 1971. Omar Blondin Diop was sentenced to three years imprisonment. He died in 1973 during torture at the prison of Gorée Island.

References

Zuccarelli, François. La vie politique sénégalaise (1940-1988). Paris: CHEAM, 1988.
Communist parties in Senegal
Defunct communist parties
Defunct political parties in Senegal